Formalist film theory is an approach to film theory that is focused on the formal or technical elements of a film: i.e., the lighting, scoring, sound and set design, use of color, shot composition, and editing. This approach was proposed by Hugo Münsterberg, Rudolf Arnheim, Sergei Eisenstein, and Béla Balázs. Today, it is a major approach in film studies.

Overview 
Formalism, at its most general, considers the synthesis (or lack of synthesis) of the multiple elements of film production, and the effects, emotional and intellectual, of that synthesis and of the individual elements.  For example, take the single element of editing. A formalist might study how standard Hollywood "continuity editing" creates a more comforting effect and non-continuity or jump cut editing might become more disconcerting or volatile.

Or one might consider the synthesis of several elements, such as editing, shot composition, and music. The shoot-out that ends Sergio Leone's Spaghetti Western Dollars trilogy is a notable example of how these elements work together to produce an effect: The shot selection goes from very wide to very close and tense; the length of shots decreases as the sequence progresses towards its end; the music builds. All of these elements, in combination rather than individually, create tension. 

Formalism is unique in that it embraces both ideological and auteurist branches of criticism. In both these cases, the common denominator for Formalist criticism is style. Ideologues focus on how socio-economic pressures create a particular style, and auteurists on how auteurs put their own stamp on the material. Formalism is primarily concerned with style and how it communicates ideas, emotions, and themes (rather than, as critics of formalism point out, concentrating on the themes of a work itself).

Ideological formalism 
Two examples of ideological interpretations that are related to formalism:

The classical Hollywood cinema has a very distinct style, sometimes called the institutional mode of representation: continuity editing, massive coverage, three-point lighting, "mood" music, dissolves, all designed to make the experience as pleasant as possible. The socio-economic ideological explanation for this is, quite crassly, that Hollywood wants to make as much money and appeal to as many ticket-buyers as possible.

Film noir, which was given its name by Nino Frank, is marked by lower production values, darker images, under lighting, location shooting, and general nihilism: this is because, we are told, during the war and post-war years filmmakers (as well as filmgoers) were generally more pessimistic. Also, the German Expressionists (including Fritz Lang, who was not technically an expressionist as popularly believed) emigrated to America and brought their stylized lighting effects (and disillusionment due to the war) to American soil.

It can be argued that, by this approach, the style or 'language' of these films is directly affected not by the individuals responsible, but by social, economic, and political pressures, of which the filmmakers themselves may be aware or not. It is this branch of criticism that gives us such categories as the classical Hollywood cinema, the American independent movement, the new queer cinema, and the French, German, and Czech new waves.

Formalism in auteur theory 
If the ideological approach is concerned with broad movements and the effects of the world around the filmmaker, then the auteur theory is diametrically opposite to it, celebrating the individual, usually in the person of the filmmaker, and how his/her personal decisions, thoughts, and style manifest themselves in the material.

This branch of criticism, begun by François Truffaut and the other young film critics writing for Cahiers du cinéma, was created for two reasons.

First, it was created to redeem the art of film itself. By arguing that films had auteurs, or authors, Truffaut sought to make films (and their directors) at least as important as the more widely accepted art forms, such as literature, music, and painting. Each of these art forms, and the criticism thereof, is primarily concerned with a sole creative force: the author of a novel (not, for example, his editor or type-setter), the composer of a piece of music (though sometimes the performers are given credence, akin to actors in film today), or the painter of a fresco (not his assistants who mix the colours or often do some of the painting themselves). By elevating the director, and not the screenwriter, to the same importance as novelists, composers, or painters, it sought to free the cinema from its popular conception as a bastard art, somewhere between theater and literature.

Secondly, it sought to redeem many filmmakers who were looked down upon by mainstream film critics. It argued that genre filmmakers and low-budget B-movies were just as important, if not more, than the prestige pictures commonly given more press and legitimacy in France and the United States. According to Truffaut's theory, auteurs took material that was beneath their talents—a thriller, a pulpy action film, a romance—and, through their style, put their own personal stamp on it.

See also 
 Clement Greenberg
 Clive Bell
 Formalism (art)
 Medium specificity
 Neoformalism (film theory)
 Russian formalism
 Structuralist film theory

Notes

References 
 Bordwell, David, Film Art: An Introduction; McGraw-Hill; 7th edition (June, 2003).
 Braudy, Leo, ed., Film Theory and Criticism: Introductory Readings; Oxford University Press; 6th edition (March, 2004).
 Gianetti, Louis, Understanding Movies; Prentice Hall; 10th edition (March, 2004)

Film theory
Formalism (aesthetics)